Chand Khedi is a small village near Kota, Rajasthan where a very old temple of Rishabhdev is situated. This temple was often invaded by Aurangzeb, one of the Mughal rulers, but he was unable to destroy the temple.

Location

Legends
Chand Khedi figures prominently in two Jain legends. It is a place of miracles. All wishes made by the disciples are fulfilled by the Lord.

In the first of these legends, dating back to the time of the Mughal invasions, a blow from an invader's axe damaged the toe of the Rishabhdev temple idol, resulting in a flow of milk which swept away the invaders and kept the temple safe.

A more recent legend dates to 2002, when a Jain saint named Sudhasagar unearthed three carved crystal images of Jain Tirthankaras in a nearby cave.  Sudhasagar was advised in a dream about the location of the images, and the images are significantly older than the 1200 year age of the village itself.

About temple 
Chandkhedi is one of the most important Jain pilgrimage in Rajasthan and is considered an architectural marvel. The mulnayak of the temple is a  idol of Rishabhanatha in padmasan posture.

References

Citations

Sources 
  
  
   
 

17th-century Jain temples
Villages in Jhalawar district
Jain temples in Rajasthan